Singyo may refer to:

Korean shamanism, also known as Singyo ("religion of deities")
Singyo-dong, neighborhood in Jongno-gu, Seoul, South Korea